The Liberals (Oi Fileleftheroi) was a liberal political party in Greece founded by Stefanos Manos in April 1999. The president suspended operations of the party in October 2001, citing economic problems and limited appeal amongst the voting public.

History
The party participated independently in popular elections only once, in the 1999 European Parliament elections, gaining 1,72% of the popular vote. In the 2000 national elections, Stefanos Manos and the Liberals entered the Parliament cooperating with New Democracy. In 2004, Stefanos Manos accepted an invitation by George Papandreou, president of the Panhellenic Socialist Party and was elected, like Andreas Adrianopoulos, in the 2004 national elections riding PASOK's ticket.

Electoral results

See also
Liberalism
Contributions to liberal theory
Liberalism worldwide
Liberalism in Greece

References

External links
The Liberals  (in Greek)

Political parties established in 1999
Liberal parties in Greece
1999 establishments in Greece